The Fly's Eye Dome was a structure designed in 1965 by R. Buckminster Fuller. Inspired by the eye of a fly, Fuller designed the dome as his idea of the affordable, portable home of the future, with windows and openings in the dome to hold solar panels and systems for water collection, thus allowing the dome to be self sufficient. Before his death in 1983, he hand-built three prototypes of the design:
 A 12-foot prototype is currently owned by Norman Foster.
 A 24-foot prototype is currently owned by Craig Robins.
 A 50-foot prototype acquired by Crystal Bridges Museum of American Art in Bentonville, Arkansas and installed in 2017.

A new version of the Fly's Eye Dome standing at 24 feet was built in 2014 in Miami under guidance from The Buckminster Fuller Institute.

References

External links
 New Fly's Eye Dome unveiled in Miami 2014
 photo of 24 Foot Fly's Eye Dome
 Buckminster Fuller's Fly's Eye Dome installed in Miami Design District 2014
 50 Foot Fly's Eye Dome in Toulouse
 The Fly's Eye Dome
 The Fly's Eye Dome at Crystal Bridges
 Fuller's Fly_eye dome v1 by commons_factory 

Architectural design
Buckminster Fuller
Collection of the Crystal Bridges Museum of American Art